William Frank Ashurst (12 April 1948 – 14 June 2022) was an English professional rugby league footballer who played in the 1960s, 1970s and 1980s, and coached in the 1980s.

Early life
Ashurst was born on 12 April 1948, the son of Frank Goulding and Mary Anne Ashurst. He grew up in Ince-in-Makerfield, living with his mother and three elder sisters, and attended Rose Bridge Secondary Modern School.

Ashurst was first introduced to rugby league at the age of 10 when he watched the television broadcast of Wigan's 13-9 victory over Workington Town in the 1958 Challenge Cup Final during the 1957–58 season at Wembley Stadium, London on Saturday 10 May 1958. During his school years, he represented the Wigan Schoolboys teams in both rugby and football, and was offered a trial by Blackburn Rovers before deciding to focus on playing rugby league.

Playing career
Ashurst was signed by Wigan from Rose Bridge ARLFC in August 1968.

Ashurst played left-, i.e. number 4, in Wigan's 7-4 victory over St. Helens in the 1968 BBC2 Floodlit Trophy Final during the 1968–69 season at Central Park, Wigan on Tuesday 17 December 1968, played left-, i.e. number 11, in the 6-11 defeat by Leigh in the 1969 BBC2 Floodlit Trophy Final during the 1969–70 season at Central Park, Wigan on Tuesday 16 December 1969, played , and was man of the match winning the Harry Sunderland Trophy, in the 12-16 defeat by St. Helens in the Championship Final during the 1970–71 season at Station Road, Swinton on Saturday 22 May 1971, played left- in the 15-8 victory over Widnes in the 1971 Lancashire County Cup Final during the 1971–72 season at Knowsley Road, St. Helens, on Saturday 28 August 1971 and played left-, and scored a try in the 13-16 defeat by Workington Town in the 1977 Lancashire County Cup Final during the 1977–78 season at Wilderspool Stadium, Warrington, on Saturday 29 October 1977.

Penrith Panthers

In 1973, Ashurst was signed by the Penrith Panthers for a record fee of £15,000, (based on increases in average earnings, this would be approximately £241,100 in 2013). While he played three seasons in the NSWRL, he became a popular figure with the new club and was notable for his prowess as a goal-kicker. This was partially due to his style of kicking: in an era where most Australian goal-kickers would approach the ball straight-on and use their toe to kick, Ashurst went "around the corner" and contacted the football with his instep, soccer-style. This produced both more power and a higher level of accuracy, and by the late 1980s most native Australian goal kickers (save for Mal Meninga) switched over to this method. In 2006, Ashurst was named in the Penrith's "Team of Legends".

Wakefield Trinity
Ashurst returned to Wigan in 1977, but was sold to Wakefield Trinity for another record fee of £18,000 in March 1978, (based on increases in average earnings, this would be approximately £136,200 in 2013). He played left-, i.e. number 11, in Wakefield Trinity's 3-12 defeat by Widnes in the 1979 Challenge Cup Final during the 1978–79 season at Wembley Stadium, London on Saturday 5 May 1979, in front of a crowd of a crowd of 94,218. He retired from playing in 1982 due to a knee injury.

International honours
Bill Ashurst won caps for Great Britain while at Wigan in 1971 against Australia, and in 1972 against France (2 matches).

Coaching career
Ashurst coached Wakefield Trinity while still playing during the 1981–82 season. He then joined Wigan as assistant coach to Alex Murphy. Ashurst also coached Runcorn Highfield between 1987 and 1989. Due to a players' strike, Ashurst came out of retirement to play in a match against former club Wigan in 1988. He was sent off during the game, and made no further appearances as a player.

Honours

Club
Wigan

League Leaders Trophy (1): 1970–71

Lancashire County League (1): 1969–70

Lancashire County Cup (1): 1971

BBC2 Floodlit Trophy (1): 1968

Individual
Harry Sunderland Trophy (1): 1971

References

External links
!Great Britain Statistics at englandrl.co.uk (statistics currently missing due to not having appeared for both Great Britain, and England)
Statistics at wigan.rlfans.com

1948 births
2022 deaths
English rugby league coaches
English rugby league players
Great Britain national rugby league team players
Lancashire rugby league team players
Liverpool City coaches
Liverpool City (rugby league) players
Penrith Panthers players
Penrith Panthers captains
People from Ince-in-Makerfield
Rugby league centres
Rugby league players from Wigan
Rugby league second-rows
Wakefield Trinity coaches
Wakefield Trinity players
Wigan Warriors players